The 1956 municipal election was held October 17, 1956 to elect five aldermen to sit on Edmonton City Council and three trustees to sit on each of the public and separate school boards.  The electorate also decided nine plebiscite questions.  There was no election for mayor, as William Hawrelak was one year into a two-year term.

There were ten aldermen on city council, but five of the positions were already filled: Abe Miller, Cliffard Roy, Hu Harries, James Falconer, and William Connelly were all elected to two-year terms in 1955 and were still in office.

There were seven trustees on the public school board, but four of the positions were already filled: Mary Butterworth, Herbert Smith, James Hanna, and William Henning were elected to two-year terms in 1955 and were still in office.  The same was true on the separate board, where Amby Lenon, Andre Dechene, Orest Demco, and Catherine McGrath were continuing.

Voter turnout

There were 13360 ballots cast out of 133537 eligible voters, for a voter turnout of 10.0%.

Results

(bold indicates elected, italics indicate incumbent)

Aldermen

Public school trustees

Separate (Catholic) school trustees

Plebiscites

Paving

Shall Council pass a bylaw creating a debenture debt in the sum of $1,000,000.00 for the City's share of standard paving on arterial and residential streets?
Yes - 8673
No - 1193

Paving and Gravelling

Details of question no longer available.
Yes - 8483
No - 1197

Asphalt and Gravel

Details of question no longer available.
Yes - 8023
No - 1494

Parks

Shall Council pass a bylaw creating a debenture debt in the sum of $500,000.00 for the improvement of City parks, and the commencement of work on undeveloped parkland, circles, buffer zones, ravine side boulevards and similar works, including, necessary new roads, sewers and drains into parkland?
Yes - 8246
No - 1444

Health Clinic

Shall Council pass a bylaw creating a debenture debt in the sum of $60,000.00 for the purpose of a health clinic to provide inoculation services, supervision of babies and pre-school children and preventative dental services?
Yes - 8755
No - 1178

Royal Alexandra Hospital

Shall Council pass a bylaw creating a debenture debt in the sum of $350,000.00 to provide equipment and furnishings at the Royal Alexandra Hospital, miscellaneous improvements to the interior and exterior of the Hospital?
Yes - 7213
No - 2433

Traffic Lights

Shall Council pass a bylaw creating a debenture debt in the sum of $150,000.00 in order to purchase and install additional traffic lights at various locations within the City?
Yes - 7987
No - 1607

Fire Hall

Shall Council pass a bylaw creating a debenture debt in the sum of $125,000.00 for the purpose of constructing a fire hall in the vicinity of 97th Street and 127th Avenue?
Yes - 7645
No - 1741

Royal Alexandra Hospital - Nurses Residence

Shall Council pass a bylaw creating a debenture debt in the sum of $2,700,000.00 for the purpose of constructing at the Royal Alexandra Hospital nurses residence and training school?
Yes - 6921
No - 2695

References

City of Edmonton: Edmonton Elections

1956
1956 elections in Canada
1956 in Alberta